Israel Matos Gil (born 14 December 1982) is a Spanish former professional tennis player.

Matos Gil, who had a best world ranking of 465, made two ATP Tour main draw appearances at the Valencia Open, including in 2004 when he was beaten in the first round by world number three Juan Carlos Ferrero.

ITF Futures titles

Singles: (1)

Doubles: (1)

References

External links
 
 

1982 births
Living people
Spanish male tennis players